MTK may refer to:

Sport
 MTK Budapest, a multi-sport club in Budapest, Hungary
 Dunaharaszti MTK, a football club in Dunaharaszti, Hungary
 MTK Global (Mack the Knife Global), a professional boxing and MMA promoter

Business
 MediaTek, a Taiwanese microchip manufacturer
 Katowice International Fair, Poland
 MTK Group, runs some public buses in Sofia

Entertainment
 MTK (musical group), a Brazilian pop and rap group
 Matt the Knife (born 1988), an American stage magician and mentalist

Other
 Main-Taunus-Kreis, district of Germany
 Makin Airport, Kiribati (IATA code "MTK")

See also
 MTK-2, Russian version of Baudot telegraphy code
 Erzsébeti Spartacus MTK LE or ESMTK, football club in Pesterzsébet, Hungary